Flor Roffé de Estévez (October 24, 1921 in Caracas – October 21, 2004 in Caracas) was a composer, writer, and professor of Venezuelan music. She came from a Jewish family, which migrated to the country at the beginning of the 20th century.

Biography 
In 1937, she learnt to teach music at the School of Music José Angel Lick, where she learned piano from Moses Moleiro, musical theory from Eduardo Square, harmony from Antonio Estévez, and music history from Juan Bautista Square. In 1944, she studied music pedagogy at the New York Teacher's College of the University of Columbia, and in 1945 at the Juilliard School of Music, and finally, at the New York Dalcroze School.

She taught Dalcroze Eurhythmics (developed by Émile Jaques-Dalcroze (1865–1950)) at both the Normal School Gran Colombia and the High School of Music (now called the School of Music Juan Manuel Olivares). In 1958 she developed, on behalf of the Ministry of Education, seminars and workshops on the implementation of the music education program of the Ministry. From 1959 to 1963 she acted as National Minister of Education Supervisor.

After a stay of several years in Paris, she founded in 1972, with the support of the National Council of Culture (CONAC), the Experimental School of Music Pedagogy, which she led for fifteen years. In 1988, she was professor of music education at the Central University of Venezuela.

In addition to numerous publications on music education, Flor Roffé de Estévez wrote a monograph on Vicente Emilio Sojo, as well as a series of editions with Venezuelan songs for various groups.

Selected publications 
 The boy and the Music, Caracas 1995
 The birthday of the gallinita. First collection dimension: red Series. It illustrated Laura Liberatore. 2ª edition of Mountain Ávila Latin American Editors CA, 14 pp. 1992 , 
 Vicente Emilio Sojo and his Cats, Caracas 1988
 Vicente Emilio and his cats: a tale that is not a tale. Collection Guarimba. With Cristina Keller. Editor Alfadil, 29 pp. 1987 , 
 Fascicle of Exercise of Harmony
 Your, I and the Music

Compositions 
 Cycle of songs for chorus and piano, 1960
 22 childish songs Venezuelan, 1976
 An onion in the pot, 44 pp. 1978
 10 Venezuelan songs to four hands, 1978
 15 Venezuelan songs even more easy, 1978

Notes

References 

Venezuelan composers
Venezuelan women composers
Venezuelan music educators
Women music educators
20th-century women musicians
2004 deaths
1921 births
Juilliard School alumni
Academic staff of the Central University of Venezuela
People from Caracas
Venezuelan women educators
Deaths in Venezuela
Venezuelan expatriates in the United States